Edward William Ephraim Regan (11 September 1909 – 2 April 1988) was an Australian rules footballer who played with Essendon in the Victorian Football League (VFL).

Regan later served in the Australian Army during World War II.

Notes

External links 

1909 births
1988 deaths
Australian rules footballers from Victoria (Australia)
Essendon Football Club players